The Denmark national flag football team is the national Flag Football team of Denmark. Controlled by the Danish American Football Federation it represents Denmark in international matches. The team won a record six consecutive European Championships, and also won silver four times in the World Championship. With 14 medals in total, they have established themselves as one of the best teams in the world, and the best in Europe.

External links 
 https://www.daff.dk/category/flag-football/ 
 http://www.efaf.info/text.php?Inhalt=euroflag

National sports teams of Denmark
Flag football